The metropolitan area of London, England, United Kingdom, is served by six international airports and several smaller airports. Together, these airports constitute the busiest airport system in the world by passenger numbers and the second-busiest by aircraft movements. In 2018, the six airports handled a total of 177,054,819 passengers. The London airports handle over 60% of all the UK's air traffic. The airports serve a total of 14 domestic destinations and 396 international destinations.

International airports

City (LCY)

Located in the London Borough of Newham, London City Airport is situated in London's Docklands, and is the closest to central London, which limits its size—the airport has a single runway, which is very short. Furthermore, the airport has a steep approach at a 5.5° angle (as opposed to the usual 3 degrees). As a result, only the smallest aircraft are permitted to use the airport, which initially prevented all long-haul flights. However, from 2009 to 2020, British Airways had operated a flight to New York JFK, via Shannon, using an Airbus A318 – the largest aircraft that can be handled at the airport.  The largest aircraft currently operating from the airport is the Airbus A220-100, slightly smaller
than the Airbus A318, with increased range and capable of taking off from London City fully loaded. Its first commercial flight completed in August 2017 from Zurich.

Located only four miles from Canary Wharf, London City Airport is often used by business travellers, with many flights serving destinations across the UK and northern Europe. The airport cannot be expanded due to the docks on either side. It is also the only airport serving London which does not operate at night.

A light rail service from London City Airport DLR station, which adjoins the terminal building of London City Airport, links it to the financial district of the City of London at Bank and Monument stations, which offer interchanges with London Underground.

Heathrow (LHR)

Located in the London Borough of Hillingdon, Heathrow is by far the largest of London's airports and considered the main gateway into the United Kingdom for non-European visitors. Heathrow has four terminals and two parallel runways. Due to the location in London's western suburbs, Heathrow has had trouble trying to expand, with various expansion projects being cancelled. As a result, the airport consistently runs at over 99% capacity and is often included on lists of the worst-rated airports in the world. However, on 1 July 2015 Heathrow's expansion plan was suggested as the best option by the Airport Commission and on 25 October 2016 a new northwest runway and terminal was approved by the Government.

The airport is connected to Great Britain's motorway network via the M4 and M25 motorways, to London Paddington station by Heathrow Express and TfL Rail trains and to other Central London destinations by London Underground trains on the Piccadilly line.

In April 2012 (before the 2012 Summer Olympics), Heathrow announced that for the first time in history it handled 70 million passengers in a calendar year, making it the third busiest airport in the world in terms of passenger numbers, after Atlanta and Beijing–Capital. It also comes second behind Dubai International Airport in the list of the busiest airport in the world in terms of international passenger numbers, as well as being the busiest airport in Europe by total passenger numbers.

Heathrow serves six continents around the world, and is the base for the flag carrier British Airways in Terminal 5. While it also serves short-haul flights, Heathrow is London's long-distance hub and is the most popular arrival point for flights from the United States of America (including New York–JFK), with 13 million passengers. However, because it is operating at capacity, Heathrow has failed to increase service to cities in the newly industrialised countries such as China, falling behind European bases like Frankfurt, Amsterdam, and Paris–Charles de Gaulle.

Gatwick (LGW)

Located in West Sussex, Gatwick is the second-busiest airport in the United Kingdom, the eighth-busiest in Europe, and the second-busiest single-runway airport in the world. It handles flights to more destinations than any other UK airport and is the main base of easyJet, the UK's largest airline by number of passengers. Also using it as a base are British Airways, Norwegian Air Shuttle and TUI Airways.

The airport consists of two terminals, North and South, is connected to the motorway network via the M23 and has its own railway station, with Southern and Thameslink trains serving London Victoria and London Bridge stations respectively as well as there being a dedicated Gatwick Express shuttle to and from London Victoria.

Luton (LTN)

Located in Bedfordshire, Luton Airport is London's fourth-largest airport, the fifth-busiest in the United Kingdom and the fourth-closest to central London, after Gatwick, Heathrow and City airports.  The two airlines supplying most passenger capacity are the low-cost carriers easyJet and Wizz Air.

Luton Airport Parkway railway station can be reached from London St Pancras in as little as 22 minutes via East Midlands Railway, while Thameslink is the primary operator, with slower but more frequent services.  An  automated people mover transit system, Luton DART, connects Luton Airport Parkway to the airport, a distance of just over a mile.

Stansted (STN)

Located in Essex, Stansted is London's third-busiest airport, being the fourth-busiest in the United Kingdom, behind Manchester Airport, 22nd-busiest in Europe and the largest operational base for Ryanair, which is Europe's largest low-cost carrier and the world's largest international airline by number of international passengers. Stansted serves more scheduled European destinations than any other airport in the UK, as well as some destinations further afield. It is the home of Air Harrods, operated by Harrods Aviation, allowing VIP aircraft to land there, such as Air Force One carrying the President of the United States, Barack Obama, in 2009 and also 2016, also President Donald Trump in 2017 and 2019.

Stansted Airport railway station is situated in the terminal building directly below the main concourse. Services to Central London are on the Stansted Express train to and from London Liverpool Street.

Southend (SEN)

Located in Essex, Southend Airport expanded commercial air transport operations to destinations in Ireland in 2011, and to mainland Europe in 2012 when easyJet commenced operations using the brand new terminal and railway station. Southend claims it only takes 15 minutes to go through arrivals from plane to train with hand luggage. It was the third-busiest airport in the United Kingdom from the 1960s until the end of the 1970s, when it was overtaken in passenger numbers by London Stansted Airport.

Southend Airport railway station is served by Abellio Greater Anglia trains, which connect the airport to London Liverpool Street station up to 8 times per hour. The journey to London takes about one hour.

Other airports
Though not generally considered London airports, Birmingham Airport and Southampton Airport have been suggested as alternative airports for London due to the existence of direct rail links serving Central London. Birmingham Airport has argued that High Speed 2, once complete, would make it an attractive option for London passengers.

Other civil airports

A number of other airports also serve the London area.

Open airports
The following are mainly used by general aviation flights.

 London Biggin Hill Airport, in the London Borough of Bromley
 Blackbushe Airport, in Hampshire
 Damyns Hall Aerodrome, in the London Borough of Havering
 Denham Aerodrome, in Buckinghamshire
 Elstree Airfield, in Hertfordshire
 Fairoaks Airport, in Surrey
 Farnborough Airport, in Hampshire
 London Heliport, in the London Borough of Wandsworth
 Lydd Airport (London Ashford Airport), in Kent
 North Weald Airfield, in Essex
 London Oxford Airport, in Oxfordshire
 Redhill Aerodrome, in Surrey
 Rochester Airport, in Kent
 Stapleford Aerodrome, in Essex
 White Waltham Airfield, in Berkshire
 Wycombe Air Park, in Buckinghamshire

Closed airports
Airports are listed at their current borough, although the area may have been outside London at the time of construction.

 Panshanger Aerodrome, in Hertfordshire
 Cricklewood Aerodrome, in the London Borough of Barnet
 Croydon Airport, in the London Borough of Croydon
 Great West Aerodrome, in the London Borough of Hillingdon
 Hendon Aerodrome, in the London Borough of Barnet
 Heston Aerodrome, in the London Borough of Hounslow
 Hounslow Heath Aerodrome, in the London Borough of Hounslow
 London Air Park (Hanworth Air Park), in the London Borough of Hounslow
 Stag Lane Aerodrome, in the London Borough of Barnet

Royal Air Force stations
There were several Royal Air Force stations in London. This list excludes those that are classed as non-flying stations.

Operational
 RAF Northolt, in the London Borough of Hillingdon, also handles civil flights

Non-operational
Station are listed at their current borough, although the area may have been outside London at the time of construction.

 RAF Biggin Hill, in the London Borough of Bromley
 RAF Fairlop, in the London Borough of Redbridge
 RAF Hendon, in the London Borough of Barnet
 RAF Heston, in the London Borough of Hounslow
 RAF Hornchurch, in the London Borough of Havering
 RAF Kenley, in the London Borough of Croydon
 RAF St Pancras, in the London Borough of Camden
 RAF Uxbridge, in the London Borough of Hillingdon

Proposed airports

Thames Estuary

Due to London's airports, particularly Heathrow, operating at full capacity, Boris Johnson, London's former mayor and former UK Prime Minister, and Sir Norman Foster have both brought up plans to have a new airport built, either on a man-made island in the Thames Estuary, or on the Isle of Grain in north Kent. Foster's proposed Thames Hub Airport would be very similar to the design of Hong Kong International Airport and Qatar's Hamad International Airport. The plans to have an airport able to handle 110 million passengers a year would require the closure of Heathrow, and probably make the new airport the busiest in the world.

The plans have met with opposition from some people living nearby warning the airport would cause a significant increase in bird strikes. Other people and local businesses, recognising the depressed levels of economic activity in north Kent, have been supportive and argue that London needs a new airport in order to be able to compete in the world.

Traffic and statistics

Passengers numbers

Cargo numbers

Change

Busiest routes

In total, there were 30 international destinations from London, and another 3 domestic routes, that handled more than 1 million passengers in 2011:

Heathrow Airport is a major hub for flights across the North Atlantic. In 2011, 11% of all north Atlantic flights originated or terminated at Heathrow, more than Paris and Frankfurt combined, and Heathrow is the European terminus for 11 of the 25 busiest north Atlantic routes.

The busiest long-haul route in the world is between London (Heathrow and Gatwick) and New York (JFK and Newark), with a total of 3,898,460 passengers travelling between the two cities in 2011.

Maps

See also
Transport in London
List of airports in the United Kingdom and the British Crown Dependencies
List of cities with more than one commercial airport

References